Daniel Schafer may refer to: 
Daniel Joseph Schafer, Detroit-Nashville musician, songwriter, recording artist 
Dan Vapid, Dan Schafer, Chicago based punk rock musician better known as his stage name
Daniel Schaefer, former U.S. Representative from Colorado
Daniel Schaffer, British writer/artist